

The Bates were a German punk band, founded in Eschwege, federal state of Hessen, in 1987. The name referred to the character Norman Bates from Alfred Hitchcock's 1960 film, Psycho. 

The Bates were mainly known for their cover versions of songs made famous by other artists. On each of their albums they published at least two such cover songs alongside original compositions. Because the cover versions were particularly well received, The Bates released the album 2nd Skin (2000), which featured cover versions of songs taken from various genres. The Beatles ("Helter Skelter"), Rolling Stones ("Out of Time"),  The Cure ("Wailing Wall"), Sailor ("Glass of Champagne"), Aneka ("Japanese Boy"), and Eiffel 65 ("Blue") were covered in the album in typical Bates style.

Amongst the Bates' most commercially successful singles was their cover version of Michael Jackson's "Billie Jean" (1995), which reached No. 10 in the Swiss charts, and No. 67 in the UK Singles Chart, gaining them the highest chart entries of their career. Some other well-received songs were the Shakespears Sister cover "Hello (Turn Your Radio On)" (1994), "A Real Cool Time" (1995), "It's Getting Dark" (1996), and "Independent Love Song" (1997). Fan favourites were "It's Getting Dark", "Say It Isn't So", "A Real Cool Time", "Bitter End", "I Don't Wanna Love You", and "Not Like You". 

In 2000, the Bates disbanded. The band members reunited only briefly in December 2006 to play one concert, as a tribute to their former singer Markus "Zimbl" Zimmer, who had died earlier that year. The concert was filmed and, together with some interviews of family, friends and former acquaintances of Zimbl, made into a film: Zimbl – A Real Cool Time. A shortened version was first screened a year later on the same date as the concert.

Discography

Studio albums
1989: No Name for the Baby
1990: Shake
1992: Psycho Junior
1993: The Bates
1995: Pleasure + Pain
1996: Kicks 'n' Chicks
1997: Punk?
1998: IntraVenus
1999: Right Here! Right Now!
2000: 2nd Skin

Live albums
1993: Unfucked: Live
1997: Live

Singles
1994: "Hello"
1995: "A Real Cool Time"
1995: "Billie Jean"
1995: "Say It Isn't So"
1996: "It's Getting Dark"
1996: "Poor Boy"
1997: "Independent Love Song"
1999: "Bitter End"

References

External links
 Laut.de
 The-bates.de
 Arealcooltime.de

1987 establishments in Germany
German punk rock groups